IOTF may refer to:

The Interagency Oncology Taskforce
The International Obesity Task Force
The Internet Operations Task Force
The Internet of Things Foundation
The Information Operations Task Force of the Multi-National Force in Iraq